Only the Ruthless Remain is the fifth studio album by American death metal band Skinless. It includes the members that produced the band's 1998 debut album, Progression Towards Evil and their second album Foreshadowing Our Demise, with the addition of a second guitarist, Dave Matthews.

Track listing 
All music by Noah Carpenter, Dave Matthews, Joe Keyser and Bob Beaulac.

Notes
After the band disbanded in 2011, Skinless reformed in 2013 with the original line-up that recorded the band's first two albums. It is their first album in nearly nine years.

Credits
Sherwood Webber - vocals
Noah Carpenter - guitar
Dave Matthews - guitar
Joe Keyser - bass guitar
Bob Beaulac - drums
Forces Of Evil Far Beyond Your Control - producer
Brad Boatright - mastering
Tom Case - mixing
Dave Otero - recording engineer
Lokmane Kherbane - Cover art, additional vocals, lyrics, general legendary-ness

References

2015 albums
Skinless albums